Crofton Station was the smaller of two stations serving Crofton (with the other being ). It was next to Doncaster Road, on the current Pontefract Line, behind the Crofton Arms Public House.

In 2001, Bombardier Transportation opened Crofton TMD, a traction maintenance depot, on the former station site.

References 

Disused railway stations in Wakefield
Railway stations in Great Britain opened in 1853
Railway stations in Great Britain closed in 1931
Former Lancashire and Yorkshire Railway stations
railway station